Jiao Lung Waterfall is the tallest measured waterfall in Taiwan, with a sheer plunge of . It is located on a cliff of Mount Da Ta in Alishan Township, Chiayi County. Its closest settlement is the small hamlet of Fengshan (豐山村). Predominantly seasonal, it has been known to have much reduced flow just several days after rain.

Although a road leads up the canyon to Fengshan, the waterfall is extremely difficult to reach during full flow. Immediately after a typhoon, the waterfall is in full flow. However, the high flows also wash away the crossings and bridges of the stream, disconnecting Fengshan from access. After just several days or even hours, the waterfall decreases noticeably in volume.

See also
 List of tourist attractions in Taiwan
 List of waterfalls

References

Plunge waterfalls
Waterfalls of Chiayi County